The Patriarca crime family, also known as the New England Mafia, the Boston Mafia, the Providence Mafia, or The Office is an Italian-American Mafia family in New England. It has two distinct factions, one based in Providence, Rhode Island, and the other in Boston, Massachusetts. The family is currently led by Carmen "The Cheese Man" Dinunzio, who is part of the Boston faction. The family is primarily active in Massachusetts, Rhode Island and Connecticut with other territory throughout New England.

History

Early years
In New England before the start of Prohibition, two separate Mafia families emerged one based in Boston, Massachusetts and the other based in Providence, Rhode Island.

In the early 1910s, Gaspare DiCola became the most powerful Mafia boss in Boston, until he was murdered on September 21, 1916. This allowed Gaspare Messina, a Sicilian mobster who had close ties to Bonanno crime family, in New York City to become the new boss of the Boston Mafia group. The Providence Mafia group formed sometime in 1917, under Frank Morelli  who went on to control bootlegging and illegal gambling operations in Providence, Maine, and Connecticut.

In 1924, Gaspare Messina stepped down as Boston's Mafia boss, assuming a businessman's role while working with Frank Cucchiara and Paolo Pagnotta from a grocery store on Prince Street in Boston's North End. A Mafia power struggle ensued in Boston, as rival gangs fought for illegal gambling, bootlegging, and loan sharking rackets, and East Boston mobster Filippo Buccola emerged as the boss of the Boston family. In December 1930 or early 1931, a Mafia meeting was held and Messina was elected the temporary capo dei capi of the American Mafia. He retired from Mafia affairs in the early 1930s and died in June 1957 in his Somerville, Massachusetts home.

During the early 1930s, Buccola battled other ethnic gangs for territory in Boston, along with his underboss Joseph Lombardo, another mobster from the North End. In December 1931, Lombardo arranged the murder of Frank Wallace, the boss of South Boston's Irish Gustin Gang. Then in 1932, Morelli merged his Providence family with Buccola's Boston family, forming the New England crime family. Buccola ruled as boss of the combined family from East Boston as he continued to fatally dispatch his competition. After the murder of Jewish mob boss Charles "King" Solomon at Buccola's command, Buccola became the most powerful gangster in Boston. On April 27, 1952, Buccola held a party in Johnston, Rhode Island, to celebrate his retirement and Raymond Patriarca's ascension to boss of the family. He retired to Sicily in 1954, where he ran a chicken farm. He died in 1987 of natural causes at the age of 101.

Patriarca era

In 1956, Patriarca made drastic changes in the family, the biggest being the relocation of their base of operations to Providence, using the National Cigarette Service Company and Coin-O-Matic Distributors, a vending machine and pinball business on Atwells Avenue, as a front organization. The business was known to family members as "The Office."

Patriarca was a strict and ruthless leader; he ran the family for decades and made it clear that other Mafia organizations were not permitted to operate in New England. He was skilled at warding off police and maintaining a low profile, thus receiving little hindrance from law enforcement. The family ventured into new rackets such as pornography and narcotics, though mob informer Vincent Teresa insisted that Patriarca forbade the family to deal in drugs.

During his reign as boss, Patriarca formed strong relationships with the New York-based Genovese crime family and Colombo crime family, deciding that the Connecticut River would be the dividing line between their territory and his own. His long-time underboss, Enrico Tameleo, was also a member of New York's Bonanno crime family. The New England family controlled organized crime in Boston and Worcester, Massachusetts, where Genovese capo Carlo Mastrototaro reigned as local boss for half a century, as well as the state of Maine; while the Genovese family controlled organized crime in Hartford, Connecticut, Springfield, Massachusetts, and Albany, New York.

In addition to having close ties to the powerful Five Families, Patriarca also sat on the Commission and had investments in two Las Vegas casinos. Another of his underbosses, Gennaro "Jerry" Angiulo, was involved in the numbers racket in Boston, and was being shaken down by rival mobsters because he was not a "made" member. Angiulo solved this problem by paying Patriarca $50,000 and agreeing to pay him $100,000 a year to become a made member of the family. Angiulo continued to control his large illegal gambling network in Boston.

The Apalachin Meeting and aftermath

In 1957, more than sixty of the country's most powerful Mafia bosses, including Joe Bonanno, Carlo Gambino, and Vito Genovese, met in Apalachin, a hamlet in upstate New York. Patriarca was also in attendance and was subsequently arrested when the meeting was suddenly raided by police, drawing much attention to him from the press, the public, and law enforcement.

The situation became worse for Patriarca in 1961, when U.S. Attorney General Robert F. Kennedy began an assault on organized crime. Law enforcement agencies worked to develop informants within the Mafia and finally succeeded in 1966, when Joe Barboza, a Patriarca family hitman, was arrested on a concealed weapons charge. Barboza claimed to have killed 26 people, but became concerned when Patriarca did not raise his bail and two of his friends were killed for trying to do so. He soon decided to turn informant.

Based on Barboza's testimony, Patriarca and Enrico Tameleo were indicted in 1967 for the murder of Providence bookmaker Willie Marfeo. Patriarca was convicted and began serving time in 1969, and Angiulo served as acting boss. Patriarca resumed control of the family after his release from prison in 1974. For his testimony, Barboza was given a one-year prison term, including time served. He was paroled in March 1969 and told to leave Massachusetts permanently. In 1971, he pleaded guilty to a second-degree murder charge in California and sentenced to five years at Folsom Prison; he was murdered in San Francisco by Joseph "J. R." Russo on February 11, 1976, less than three months after his release.

Patriarca was plagued by law enforcement for the rest of his life, and he was charged numerous times for a variety of crimes until his death. In 1978, Vincent Teresa testified that Patriarca had participated in a 1960 attempt by the Central Intelligence Agency to kill Fidel Castro that was never carried out. In 1983, Patriarca was charged with the murder of Raymond Curcio, and he was arrested in 1984 for the murder of Robert Candos, whom Patriarca believed was an informant. Patriarca died of a heart attack on July 11, 1984, aged 76.

Patriarca Junior and the decline

After Patriarca's death, the New England family began a long period of decline, resulting from both legal prosecution and internal violence. Angiulo attempted to take over as boss from behind bars, while Larry Zannino, the family's top lieutenant, backed Patriarca's son Raymond Patriarca, Jr. for the position. The Commission approved Patriarca, Jr.'s ascendancy to leadership and his position was confirmed. Zannino was made consigliere, but he was sentenced to thirty years in prison in 1987. Angiulo was sentenced to 45 years in prison on racketeering charges. Other senior members died or were imprisoned, such as Henry Tameleo and Francesco Intiso.

William "The Wild Man" Grasso, an East Hartford-based gangster, became underboss because of the younger Patriarca's weak leadership. Some investigators believed that Grasso was actually in charge, but these rumors ended when Grasso was found dead in June 1989, slain by a gangster from Springfield as factions of the family began fighting each other for dominance. Grasso's murder weakened Patriarca, Jr.'s position. Nicholas Bianco was eventually indicted for the murder, but he became acting underboss before taking over the family's Providence operations.

On March 26, 1990, Patriarca, Jr. and twenty other family members and associates were indicted on charges of racketeering, extortion, narcotics, gambling, and murder. The indictments included underboss Bianco, consigliere Joseph Russo, and lieutenants Biagio DiGiacomo, Vincent Ferrara, Matthew Guglielmetti, Joseph A. Tiberi Sr, Dennis Lepore, Gaetano J. Milano, Jack Johns, John "Sonny" Castagna, Louis Fallia, Frank and Louis Pugliono, Frank Colontoni and Robert Carrozza. The arrests were described as "the most sweeping attack ever launched on a single organized crime family." One of the most damaging pieces of evidence was a tape recording of a Mafia induction ceremony, at which thirteen mafiosi were present. Because of this embarrassment, Patriarca was replaced as boss by Bianco, who maintained a very low profile. However, Bianco was sentenced to eleven years in prison in 1991, while eight other family members were convicted on Racketeer Influenced and Corrupt Organizations Act (RICO) charges. Bianco died in prison in 1994.

On January 6, 1992, all of the defendants in the RICO trial pleaded guilty and received lengthy sentences and large fines. Patriarca, Jr. was sentenced to eight years in prison in June 1992 after pleading guilty to racketeering charges. In 1993, 26 others were indicted and convicted for running a bookmaking operation.

Internal warfare

Frank Salemme took control of the family after the RICO trial of Patriarca Jr. which moved the family's base of power to Boston. With Salemme's ascension to the boss sparked tension among the family's factions.

On March 31, 1994, Patriarca soldiers Ronald Coppola and Pete Scarpellini were shot and killed at a social club in Cranston, Rhode Island, by another Patriarca soldier, Nino Cucinotta, during a card game. On October 20, 1994, Joe Souza was shot inside an East Boston phone booth, dying from his injuries at the hospital on October 31. On December 11, 1994, 25-year old drug dealer and Salemme loyalist Paul Strazzulla was shot and killed, his body recovered inside of his fire-torched car in Revere, Massachusetts.

In January 1995, Salemme was indicted along with Stephen Flemmi and James "Whitey" Bulger on extortion and racketeering charges, and Salemme discovered through court documents that his close allies Flemmi and Bulger were long-time FBI informants. Bulger's friend, FBI agent John Connolly, let him run his criminal operations with impunity for informing on the Patriarca family.

After Salemme was imprisoned, a renegade faction led by Robert F. Carrozza, Anthony Ciampi, Stephen Foye, and Michael P. Romano, Sr. waged war on the Salemme faction. On April 3, 1996, 63-year old Richard "Vinnie the Pig" DeVincent was shot and killed in Medford, Massachusetts, after refusing to pay street tax from Salemme loyalists. In April 1997, the FBI indicted fifteen members of the renegade faction, including Carrozza, Ciampi, Romano, and others. The grand jury testimony that resulted in the indictments was dominated by Sean Thomas Cote, who was the first of four indicted members to turn state's evidence. The jury ultimately acquitted the defendants of most charges but was deadlocked on murder and racketeering charges. Following Salemme's indictment, Providence family member Luigi "Baby Shacks" Manocchio took control of the family.

Several of the defendants changed their pleas to guilty during a second trial, including Ciampi and Eugene Rida. Salemme pleaded guilty to racketeering charges on December 9, 1999, and was sentenced to eleven years in prison on February 23, 2000. In early 2001, Salemme agreed to testify against Flemmi and Bulger.

Turn of the century
The New England family is estimated to have about sixty made members active in the New England area, especially in the cities of Boston and Providence. In recent years, the family has been hit with several RICO indictments, and two Caporegimes (Mark Rossetti and Robert DeLuca) have become government informants. The power structure was said to have moved back to Boston entering the 2010s.

Peter "Chief Crazy Horse" Limone took over as boss of the family in 2009. Limone was arrested that year and charged with racketeering; he was given a suspended sentence on July 1, 2010.

Retired boss Luigi "Baby Shacks" Manocchio was arrested in Fort Lauderdale, Florida, on January 19, 2011, and was charged with extortion and conspiracy. Manocchio had stepped down as boss in 2009, after the FBI began investigating two strip clubs in late 2008. In February 2012, Manocchio agreed to plead guilty and was sentenced to 5½ years in prison for extortion on May 11, 2012.

On December 17, 2011, family consigliere Anthony "Ponytail Tony" Parrillo was arrested after a physical altercation at his establishment in Providence, Club 295, and was later charged with two counts of felony assault. Parrello had his bouncers attack patron Jack Fernandes after misidentifying him for another man who had engaged in sexual acts in the club's bathroom then stabbed a security guard when he confronted him about it: Fernandes was using the same bathroom stall as the aggressor. The assault began in the bathroom and continued in the back alley of the club where Fernandes's wife,  Sumiya Majeed, was injured as well. Fernandes suffered a broken nose, broken ribs and a shattered eye socket. Parrillo was sentenced to serve five years from a 15-year sentence in prison on April 11, 2016, but appealed his conviction to the Rhode Island Supreme Court. He was released on bail pending the appeal, but his motion was denied and he began his sentence on August 5, 2020.

In late 2009, Anthony DiNunzio became the acting boss after Limone's arrest. DiNunzio operates from Boston's North End and is the younger brother to Carmen DiNunzio. In 2010, DiNunzio extorted Rhode Island strip clubs with members of the Gambino crime family. On April 25, 2012, DiNunzio was arrested and charged with racketeering and extortion. On September 13, 2012, DiNunzio pleaded guilty to shaking down Rhode Island strip clubs, and was sentenced to six years on November 14, 2012.

On October 2, 2014, acting boss Antonio L. "Spucky" Spagnolo, 72, and reputed made man Pryce "Stretch" Quintina, 74, were arrested for allegedly extorting thousands of dollars in protection payments from a video poker machine company, which installed machines for illegal gambling in bars and social clubs. Spagnolo took over as acting boss after DiNunzio was arrested back in 2012. Both Spagnolo and Quintina are reputedly old members of the Patriarca crime family's Boston faction.

Family underboss Carmen "The Cheese Man" DiNunzio was released from prison on February 17, 2015 after serving five and  a half years on bribery charges. Upon his release, he was thought to renew his position within the family and reconvene with his old North End crew. DiNunzio reportedly inducted his nephew, Louis "Baby Cheese" DiNunzio and two other members of his crew, Johnny Scarpelli and Salvatore "Tea Party Tore" Marino into the family during a ceremony held in the basement of a North End restaurant and attended by boss Peter Limone, acting boss Anthony "Spucky" Spagnolo and Providence capo Matthew "Good-Looking Matty" Guglielmetti. At that same event, DiNunzio promoted his bodyguard Gregory "Fat Boy" Costa to capo of the North End crew.

Family boss Peter Limone died of cancer on June 19, 2017. He was succeeded by his acting boss Carmen DiNunzio, who is the current family leader. DiNunzio led an administration consisting of underboss Matthew "Good-Looking Matty" Guglielmetti and consigliere Joseph "Joe the Bishop" Achille, both members of the Providence faction. Achille died on August 7, 2018. Since at least 2020, Guglielmetti relinquished the position of underboss to Edward "Eddie" Lato due to health concerns and regained the rank of capo.

On July 18, 2022, former boxer and actor Dino Guilmette was arrested on drug trafficking charges in Cranston, Rhode Island. He had been the target of a two-year investigation by the Rhode Island State Police into the sale of cocaine and lorazepam, which he reportedly engaged in in September and November 2021. According to a State Police affidavit, Guilmette has ties to the New England Mafia and dealt in narcotics trafficking under the authorization of Providence capo Matthew Guglielmetti. Several evidence files in the case were taken from surveillance records of the Toscan Social Club, an organized crime meeting place for which Guilmette was vice president.

On October 27, 2022, Rhode Island State House senior deputy chief of staff John Conti resigned from his post amid allegations that he was a silent partner in a marijuana growing business with Patriarca family associate Raymond "Scarface" Jenkins. A State Police probe revealed the two shared an interest in the Organic Bees marijuana grow operation, which started in 2017 and shut down in 2022 because Conti and Jenkins would not disclose their involvement in the business. Conti and Jenkins were also surveilled in December 2020 camera recordings meeting just outside the State House and conversing for approximately 20 minutes. The former chief of staff was also mentioned meeting with several other high-ranking Patriarca mobsters, including a 2020 Christmas party at a Providence restaurant attended by Conti, capo Matthew Guglielmetti and underboss Edward "Eddie" Lato. Conti's attorney Jimmy Burchfield Jr. stated to WPRI "Mr. Conti had no role in the business organization, Organic Bees […] Mr. Conti has been employed by the House of Representatives honorably, serving under four speakers since first hired in December 2006."

In December 2022, former boss Frank Salemme, who later became a government informant died in federal prison.

Historical leadership

Boss (official and acting) 
1Excluding Frank Morelli
 c. 1910–1916: Gaspare DiCola — murdered on September 21, 1916. Boston
 1916–1924: Gaspare Messina — stepped down, died in 1957 Boston
 1924–1954: Filippo "Phil" Buccola — united both families in 1932, retired, died in 1987 Boston
 1954–1984: Raymond L. S. Patriarca, Sr. — imprisoned in 1970, died on July 11, 1984 Providence
 1968–1973: Gennaro "Jerry" Angiulo — stepped down Boston
 1984–1991: Raymond "Junior" Patriarca, Jr. — stepped down in 1991 Providence
 de facto 1990–1991: Nicholas "Nicky" Bianco — became official boss Providence
 1991: Nicholas "Nicky" Bianco — imprisoned on December 28, 1991 and died on December 14, 1994 Providence
 1991–1996: Frank "Cadillac Frank" Salemme — jailed in 1995, turned government witness died December 2022 Boston
 Acting 1995–1996: John "Action Jack" Salemme — brother to Frank Salemme; jailed Boston
 1996–2009: Luigi "Baby Shacks" Manocchio — stepped down, imprisoned Providence
 2009–2016: Peter "Chief Crazy Horse" Limone — died June 19, 2017 Boston
 Acting 2009–2012: Anthony L. DiNunzio — arrested on April 25, 2012 Boston
 Acting 2012–2015: Anthony "Spucky" Spagnolo — arrested on October 2, 2014 Boston
 Acting 2015–2016: Carmen "The Big Cheese" Dinunzio Boston
 2016–present: Carmen "The Big Cheese" Dinunzio Boston

Notes
1Frank Morelli was the first boss of the Providence crime family from 1917 until 1932 when he stepped down, becoming underboss to Buccola

Underboss (official and acting)
 c. 1920–1932: Joseph "J.L." Lombardo  — became consigliere Boston
 1932–1947: Frank "Butsey" Morelli — retired Providence
 1947–1954: Raymond L. S. Patriarca, Sr. — promoted to boss Providence
 1954–1968: Enrico "Henry the Referee" Tameleo — imprisoned for life in 1968, died 1985 Boston
 1968–1983: Gennaro "Jerry" Angiulo — imprisoned in 1983, died 2009 Boston
 1984–1985: Francesco "Paul" Intiso — died  
 1985–1989: William "The Wild Guy" Grasso — murdered 
 1989–1991: Nicholas "Nicky" Bianco — promoted to boss Providence
 1991: Frank "Cadillac Frank" Salemme — promoted to boss  Boston
 1991–1996: Robert DeLuca — imprisoned Providence
 Acting 1996: Luigi "Baby Shacks" Manocchio — promoted to boss Providence
 1996–2004: Alexander Santoro "Sonny Boy" Rizzo — imprisoned in 1995–1998  Boston
 2004–2015: Carmen S. "The Cheese Man" DiNunzio Boston — promoted to acting boss
 Acting 2008–2009: Peter "Chief Crazy Horse" Limone — promoted to boss Boston
 Acting 2009–2011: Robert "Bobby The Cigar" DeLuca — turned government witness Providence
 2015–2020:  Matthew "Good Looking Matty" Guglielmetti — stepped down Providence
 2020–present: Edward "Eddie" Lato  Providence

Consigliere
 1932–1954: Joseph "J.L." Lombardo — retired, died on July 17, 1969  Boston
 1954–1976: Frank "The Cheeseman" Cucchiara — committed suicide on January 23, 1976 Boston
 1976–1984: Vittore Nicolo "Nicky" Angiulo — demoted, died 1987 Boston
 1984–1987: Ilario "Larry Baione" Zannino — imprisoned in 1985, died 1996 Boston
 1987–1992: Joseph "J.R." Russo  — imprisoned in 1990, died 1998 Boston
 1992–1998: Charles "Cue Ball" Quintana — imprisoned in 1998 Boston
 1998–2002: Rocco "Shaky" Argenti — died Providence
 2003–2009: Peter "Chief Crazy Horse" Limone — promoted to Boss  Boston
 2009–2015: Anthony "Ponytail Tony" Parrillo — imprisoned Providence 
 2016–2018: Joseph "Joe the Bishop" Achille — died  Providence
 2018–Present: Unknown

Current family members

Administration 
 Boss: Carmen S. "The Cheese Man" DiNunzio—also known as "The Big Cheese"; boss of the family since 2017 after the death of Peter Limone. During the 1980s, DiNunzio and his brother Anthony were underlings of then-underboss Gennaro "Jerry" Angiulo. Their relationship soured in 1983 after DiNunzio attempted to extort Angiulo's protégé Vincent "Dee Dee" Gioacchini, and Angiulo put a contract on him. The DiNunzio brothers sought refuge in Las Vegas and Los Angeles, where they worked as bookmakers and debt collectors for the Chicago Outfit. In 1992, they were both indicted along with the Outfit leadership on racketeering charges, and sentenced to four years in prison. While incarcerated, the brothers regained their prestige in the Boston Mafia through their association with New York mobsters, and after their release in 1997, were both made into the Patriarca family by boss Luigi "Baby Shacks" Manocchio. Shortly after, DiNunzio was made capo of the North End crew and in 2003 was promoted to underboss of the family. In 2008, DiNunzio was indicted on corruption charges stemming from an undercover operation. He pled guilty to bribery charges and was sentenced to six years in prison on September 24, 2009.  In February 2015, DiNunzio was released from prison.
 Underboss: Edward C. "Eddie" Lato Jr.—also known as "Little Eddie"; underboss of the family since 2020. A former capo and career criminal, Lato had 32 arrests and 18 convictions by 2012. He was part of Frank "Bobo" Marrapese's crew during the 1970s and 1980s. Lato was investigated for the murder of Patriarca family enforcer Kevin Hanrahan on September 18, 1992. Hanrahan was shot to death by a pair of masked gunmen outside a steakhouse in Federal Hill. On March 25, 1999, Lato and several members of his crew were indicted on racketeering and loansharking charges as part of a four-year FBI investigation. He was sentenced to five years in prison, being released in 2004. Lato was arrested and charged with being the leader of an illegal sports betting ring in Providence on December 10, 2006. In 2011, he was first arrested on May 6 for being involved in an illegal gambling ring along with mobsters Frank Marrapese and Alfred "Chippy" Scivola, as well as 23 others; on November 19, 2014, he was given a 10-year suspended sentence and 10 years of probation. Then, he was indicted on September 22, 2011 on racketeering and extortion charges stemming from his shakedown of Providence strip clubs along with Scivola and retired boss Luigi "Baby Shacks" Manocchio, among others. Lato received the stiffest sentence in the case; nine years in prison. He was released from prison and into a Pawtucket halfway house on January 30, 2019. Lato was identified as the family's underboss in a State Police affidavit released in 2022 which also mentioned him attending a Christmas party on December 22, 2020 with other Patriarca family mobsters and John Conti, a chief of staff at the Rhode Island State House who was investigated for corruption allegations.
 Consigliere: Unknown

Caporegimes

Boston faction
 Gregory "Fat Boy" Costa: also known as "Fat Greg"; was promoted to capo of the "North End (DiNunzio) crew" by Carmen DiNunzio during an induction ceremony in 2015, in which Johnny Scarpelli, Salvatore Marino, and Louie DiNunzio were inducted. Costa was DiNunzio's bodyguard and driver and was described as his "top collector". He did a prison bid and was released on May 10, 1996. Costa was arrested in 2002, and again in 2006 with Carmen DiNunzio on racketeering charges, but was acquitted.
 Frederick "Freddie the Neighbor" Simone: capo of the East Boston crew. Simone is longtime member of East Boston crew serving under Biagio DiGiacomo and Anthony Spagnolo. In the early 2000's Simone along with Vincent Gioacchini started a serious feud with their capo Anthony "Spucky" Spagnolo over gambling territory in East Boston. The feud almost led to an internal war until then boss Luigi "Baby Shacks" Manocchio and Rhode Island based captain Matthew Guglielmetti were able to settle it. In 2009, after Simone was released from prison Federal authorities label him as the new captain of the crew "East Boston (Spagnolo/Day Square) crew". Simone is a close ally to boss Carmine DiNunzio.
 Vincent "Vinnie The Animal" Ferrara: capo operating from Norfolk County. According to the FBI, Ferrara was made into the family in 1983 and was sponsored by North End capo Donato "Smiling Danny" Angiulo. After the Angiulo brother's were indicted Ferrara became the boss of the North End crew. In 1990, Ferrara was indicted on racketeering and pleaded guilty to ordering the October 28, 1985, murder of mob associate Jimmy Limoli and other racketeering charges. In 2005, Ferrara's lawyer had the charge of Limoli's murdered removed and had six years removed from his prison sentence. In 2006, Ferrara was released prison and claimed he retired from Mafia affairs. In 2008, Ferrara was on trial in Norfolk County for bookmaking, but the charges were later dropped.

Providence faction
Matthew L. "Good-Looking Matty" Guglielmetti Jr. – former underboss and capo operating from Cranston. The son of family soldier Matthew Guglielmetti Sr., he was favoritised by Raymond Patriarca from his early criminal career in the 1970s. He was inducted in a Boston ceremony in 1977 along with seven other mobsters, and was arrested with his father in 1984 for liquor hijacking, though the charges were later dropped. Guglielmetti was promoted to a captain's position by Raymond Patriarca Jr. in the late 1980s, and was put in charge of the family's Connecticut faction after the murder of underboss William "Wild Guy" Grasso in 1989. That same year, he attended a making ceremony in Medford, Massachusetts presided by Patriarca Jr. and Joseph "J.R." Russo.  Was sentenced to 11 years in prison in 2005 for "protecting" a shipment of cocaine passing through Rhode Island. He was also arrested that year for infiltrating labor unions in greater-Providence. On June 10, 2014 Guglielmetti was released from prison. Since his release from prison Guglielmetti has been working with Philadelphia crime family capo George Borgesi.
 Joseph "Joe" Ruggiero Sr.: capo operating from Fall River, Massachusetts. A Barrington resident, Ruggiero was a close associate of former bosses Francis "Cadillac Frank" Salemme and Luigi "Baby Shacks" Manocchio, for whom he acted as a driver and bodyguard. In 1997, Manocchio ordered him to reclaim the family's illegal operations in Fall River after the incarceration of high-ranking associate Gerard "The Frenchman" Ouimette, who previously oversaw rackets in the area. Around 2015, Ruggiero was promoted to capo of retired Providence mobster William "Blackjack" DelSanto's crew. A prominent businessman, Ruggiero has owned many establishments and properties, including a bar and grille in Fall River, a restaurant called The Regatta, car dealerships in Barrington and East Providence, the old Fall River police station and the Edmund Place Health Center. In 2012, he struck a $3 million deal when he bought the Fall River Ford automobile dealership, and was shortly thereafter elected to the city's Board of Economic Development. Ruggiero's connections to former Fall River mayor William A. Flanagan were scrutinized, and Flanagan even publicly referred to him as "a key to the city's economic future".

Soldiers

Boston faction
North End (DiNunzio) crew

 Anthony "The Little Cheese" DiNunzio: former acting boss and brother to boss Carmen "The Cheeseman" DiNunzio and powerful Boston mobster. DiNunzio along with his brother Carmen control Boston's North End crew. In 2012, acting boss Anthony DiNunzio was indicted along with Providence capo Edward Lato and Providence soldier Alfred Scivola for extorting a number of Rhode Island strip clubs. In September 2017, Anthony DiNunzio was released from prison.
 Louie "Baby Cheese" DiNunzio: son of Anthony DiNunzio, he was inducted into the family by his uncle Carmen DiNunzio.
 John "Johnny" Scarpelli: soldier operating from the North End. A protégé of Carmen DiNunzio along with Salvatore Marino, they were both arrested on racketeering charges with DiNunzio in 2006. According to the indictment, Scarpelli devised a shooting scheme with Marino and Gregory Costa in 2001 to defraud bookmaker Jamie Candelino by collecting the revenues of bets if they won and not paying for their losses. Scarpelli, Marino and Louis DiNunzio, the nephew of Carmen DiNunzio, were reportedly inducted by the older DiNunzio at a making ceremony in July 2015 in the basement of a North End bar, which was also attended by boss Peter Limone, acting boss Antonio Spagnolo and capo Matthew Guglielmetti.
 Salvatore "Tea Party Tore" Marino: soldier operating from the North End. Marino and John Scarpelli were both Carmen DiNunzio's protégés and were arrested with him on racketeering charges in 2006. According to the indictment, Marino, Scarpelli and Gregory Costa were involved in a shooting scheme in 2001 to defraud bookmaker Jamie Candelino by collecting the revenues of bets if they won and not paying for their losses. Marino, Scarpelli and Louis DiNunzio were reportedly inducted by Carmen DiNunzio at a making ceremony in July 2015 in the basement of a North End bar, which was also attended by boss Peter Limone, acting boss Antonio Spagnolo and capo Matthew Guglielmetti.
 William "Billy The Angel" Angelesco

East Boston crew

 Antonio L. “Spucky” Spagnolo: former acting boss and capo of East Boston crew. Spagnolo is an old time East Boston mobster who used to work with Bobby Carrozza and Bobby’s stepbrother J.R. Russo. In 1976, Spagnolo along with East Boston capo Joe "J.R." Russo murdered notorious New England mob turncoat Joe "The Animal" Barboza, in San Francisco. During the 1980s, Spagnolo reported to East Boston capo Biagio DiGiacomo, a Sicilian born New England mobster operating from the Roma restaurant. In the late 1980s, an FBI undercover agent named Vince DelaMontaigne, infiltrated the DiGiacomo (East Boston) crew and Spagnolo ran illegal cards games with the agent. In 1990, he participated in a Mafia induction ceremony where they burned the card of a saint at a house in Medford, and he was arrested afterwards. In 1990, Spagnolo was arrested along with Vincent Giacchini after it was revealed that an undercover FBI infiltrated their East Boston crew, that was headed by Biagio DiGiacomo. After his release from prison Spagnolo took over as capo of the East Boston crew. In the early 2000's Spagnolo started a feud with soldiers Frederick Simone and Vincent Gioacchini over gambling territory in East Boston. The feud almost led to an internal war until then boss Luigi "Baby Shacks" Manocchio and Rhode Island based captain Matthew Guglielmetti were able to settle it. In early 2000, Spagnolo and Gioacchini were indicted and charged with extortion. In 2012, Spagnolo became the family's acting boss. On October 2, 2014, Spagnolo and Pryce "Stretch" Quintina were arrested and charged with extorting thousands of dollars in protection payments from a video poker machine company. In October 2017, Spagnolo was released from prison.
 Pryce "Stretch" Quintina: close ally to Anthony Spagnolo
 Vincent "Dee Dee" Gioacchini: close ally to Frederick Simone
 Biagio DiGiacomo: Sicilian born mobster and former caporegime of East Boston crew, who operated from Roma restaurant, in East Boston. DiGiacomo unknowingly allowed an undercover FBI agent Vince DelaMontaigne to infiltrated his crew during 1983 to 1987, the FBI surveillance team was able to record the October 29, 1989, Mafia induction ceremony. In February 1987, DiGiacomo along with soldier Anthony Spagnolo were arrested and charged with illegal gambling and conspiracy to commit murder.

Unknown crew

 Pasquale "Patsy" Barone: protégé of North End mob capo Vinnie "The Animal" Ferrara. He was released from prison in 2003.
 Darin "Nino" Bufalino: was former boss Frank Salemme's driver and bodyguard. In 2009, Bufalino was arrested for robbery and 2010 he was arrested for racketeering and extortion case alongside East Boston crew capo and FBI informant Mark Rosetti. He pleaded guilty to both cases in 2012 and was sentenced to seven years in prison. In December 2018, Bufalino was released from prison.
 Robert "Bobby Russo" Carrozza: stepbrother to former consigliere and East Boston mobster Joe "J.R." Russo
 Vincent Federico: close ally to former consigliere and East Boston mobster Joe "J.R." Russo
 Dennis "Champagne Denny" Lepore: ally of former boss Frank Salemmes's North End Boston crew. Lepore a North End mobster was Salemme's buffer to communicate with the East Boston crew.
 Carmen Tortora: close ally to former consigliere and East Boston mobster Joe "J.R." Russo
 Michael Prochilo: East Boston mobster who worked for former capo turned government informant Mark Rossetti.
 James Martorano: Boston mobster
 Carmen Tortora: soldier who worked closely with Boston mobster Vincent M. Ferrara. On March 22, 1990, Tortora was indicted with seven others on various crimes including RICO.
 Richard Ernest Gamable: Boston mobster who worked for Gennaro Angiulo. On September 14, 1984, Gamable was indicted along with Jason Angiulo, James Limone and others and charged with RICO violations.

Providence faction
 Vito "The Ox" DeLuca: Providence mobster who worked closely with Anthony "The Saint" St. Laurent. In 2000, DeLuca was deported to Italy after his conviction in a bookmaking case alongside St. Laurent.
 Anthony "Ponytail Tony" Parrillo: Providence based soldier and protégé of former boss Luigi Manocchio. In August 2016, Parrillo was sentenced to five-year prison term for felony assault. He was previously served 11 years for a double homicide that he committed in 1977.

Connecticut faction
 Mariano Grasso: also known as "Mario", is the son of former Underboss William "The Wild Guy" Grasso. In 2004, Grasso was arrested along with New Haven, Connecticut mobster Anthony Ascenzia and charged with running an illegal sports betting operations.

Inactive members
 Luigi "Baby Shacks" Manocchio: served as boss of the family from 1996 to 2009, he stepped down. In 2011, he was arrested for his involvement in "shaking down" Rhode Island strip clubs. In 2015 he was released from prison.
 Raymond "Junior" Patriarca: served as boss of the family for a short time after his father Raymond L. S. Patriarca died. During the early 1990s, Patriarca Jr. stepped down as boss and retired from mob life. Patriarca Jr. became involved in real estate in Rhode Island.

Past members
 Vittore Nicolo "Nicky" Angiulo: a former consigliere operating from Boston. Vittore Nicolo was the eldest of all the Angiulo brothers. In 1983, Angiulo was indicted along with his four brothers. The FBI stated that Nick Angiulo was demoted from consigliere position after his brother Gennaro Angiulo tried to become the new boss of the family. On September 13, 1987, Angiulo died from a kidney ailment.
 Anthony "Tony the Beaver" Ascenzia: former made member who operated a multimillion-dollar illegal sports betting operation in Greater New Haven, Connecticut, area for the family. Ascenzia shared the New Haven gambling profits with his Providence-based capo Matthew Guglielmetti. In 2004, Ascenzia was sentenced to three years in prison and fined $25,000 after pleading guilty to racketeering and tax fraud. Ascenzia died on July 23, 2020.
 Ralph "Ralphie Chong" Lamattina: former soldier operating from Boston; Lamattina was part of capo Ilario Zannino's crew. He was the brother of fellow Boston faction soldier Joseph "Joe Black" Lamattina. He managed a coffee shop in the North End called the Nite Lite Café. According to government witness Vincent Teresa, Lamattina was in charge of the family's narcotics operations. He was suspected as a culprit in the death of Irish mobster George Killeen, who was shot to death on May 20, 1950. On November 15, 1966, Lamattina was involved in the murders of Greek gangster Arthur "Tash" Bratsos and his bodyguard Thomas "Tommy D" De Prisco, who were lured into the Nite Lite Café and shot to death by Zannino. He was convicted as an accessory after the fact and sentenced to two years in prison. On September 14, 1984, Lamattina was indicted along with six other mobsters on racketeering, conspiracy and illegal gambling charges. He avoided prosecution and fled to Italy, remaining a fugitive for 11 years before turning himself in on August 14, 1995. He was sentenced to five years in prison, being released on June 1, 2000. Lamattina died on April 10, 2017.
 Peter J. "Chief Crazy Horse" Limone: a former boss of the family. In 2001, Limone was released from prison after serving 33 years for a murder that he didn't commit. Limone later won a $26 million judgment for his wrongful conviction. Limone operated from Boston and served as the family's consigliere before 2009, after which he was promoted to boss. He was arrested on gambling charges in 2009; in 2010, he was given a suspended sentence. He died on June 19, 2017.
 Alfred "Chippy" Scivola Jr.: former soldier operating from Rhode Island. Scivola was arrested in January 1983 along with capo Frank "Bobo" Marrapese for purchasing a hundred La-Z-Boy chairs they knew to be stolen. In 2005, he was convicted of shaking down Stamford, Connecticut, strip clubs and was sentenced to two years in prison. On September 23, 2011, Scivola was indicted along with retired boss Luigi "Baby Shacks" Manocchio and five others of extorting a number of strip clubs in Providence. He was sentenced to nearly four years in prison and was released on January 23, 2015. Scivola died on July 14, 2017.

Government informants and witnesses

Citations

General and cited references 

 Capeci, Jerry. The Complete Idiot's Guide to the Mafia. Indianapolis: Alpha Books, 2002. .
 Critchley, David. The Origin of Organized Crime in America: The New York City Mafia, 1891–1931. New York: Routledge Publishing, 2009. .
 DeVico, Peter J. The Mafia Made Easy: The Anatomy and Culture of La Cosa Nostra. Tate Publishing, 2007. .
 Ford, Beverly and Schorow, Stephanie. The Boston Mob Guide: Hit Men, Hoodlums & Hideouts. Charleston, SC: The History Press, 2011. .
 Morelli, Rocco. Forgetta 'Bout It: From Mafia to Ministry. Orlando, FL: Bridge-Logos Foundation, 2007. .
 Puleo, Stephen. The Boston Italians: A Story of Pride, Perseverance, and Paesani, from the Years of the Great Immigration to the Present Day. Boston: Beacon Press, 2007. .
 Silverman, Mark and Scott Deitche. Rogue Mobster: The Untold Story of Mark Silverman and the New England Mafia. Strategic Media Books, 2012. .

External links

 The American Mafia—New England Crime Bosses
 Americanmafia.com—Providence Mafia
 Americanmafia.com—Boston Mafia
 American Gangland: Patriarca Crime Family

 
1916 establishments in Massachusetts
1916 establishments in Rhode Island
Gangs in Connecticut
Gangs in Maine
Gangs in Massachusetts
Gangs in New Hampshire
Gangs in Rhode Island
Italian-American crime families
Italian-American culture in Boston
Italian-American culture in Providence, Rhode Island
Organizations based in Boston
Organizations based in Providence, Rhode Island
Organizations established in 1916